Arshadul Qadri (5 March 1925 – 29 April 2002) was a Sunni Islamic scholar, author and missionary activist in India associated with the Barelvi movement who established several educational institutions and organizations in India.

Early life and education
He was born in 1925, in "Sayyidpura", Balia, Uttar Pradesh, India in the family of Maulana Abdul Latif who was himself a religious scholar. His grandfather Maulana Azeemullah Shah was also scholar of repute.
He received his basic and intermediate education under his grandfather and father then to continue his higher education  he moved to Al Jamiatul Ashrafia Islamic seminary.  At Ashrafia, he studied under the supervision of Shah Abdul Aziz Moradabadi also knows as Hafiz-e-Millat and completed his education from Ashrafia, Mubarakpur in 1944.

Organizational work
Many prominent Sunni Islamic organizations and institutions were established by his efforts.
He and other Pakistani Sunni scholars established Dawat e Islami and selected Ilyas Qadri as its head.

He also established Madinatul Islam, the Hague (Netherlands), Islamic Missionary College (Bradford, Britain),  Darul Uloom Aleemia (Suriname, America), Jamia Amjadia Rizvia Ghosi, Jamia Faizul Uloom, (Jamshedpur), Darul Ziaul Islam (Howrah), Darul Uloom Makhdumia (Guwahati), Madrasa Madinatul Uloom (Bangalore), Faizul Uloom High School, (Jamshedpur) and Jamia Hazrat Nizamuddin Auliya (New Delhi).

He was influential in establishing the World Islamic Mission which is an umbrella organisation for Sunni Barelvi in the United Kingdom and in Europe.

Allama established Idaarah-i-Shar'iayh (Shara'ai Council) (Patna, Bihar), All India Muslim Personal Law Conference at Siwan, Bihar and All India Muslim United Front Raipur, Chhattisgarh.

Qadri was appointed the first Secretary General of World Islamic Mission with its head office located in Bradford, England. Islamic scholar and present leader of WIM Qamaruzzaman Azmi stated, 'Allama  Arshadul Qadri's work in England was to lay the proper foundations of Ahle Sunna wal Jam'aat which would give rise to an intellectually sound and spiritually based Islam in Europe'.
The plan of the project of Bihar Madrasa Education Board and its establishment was his work.

Books
His books include:
Tableeghi Jama'at 
Zer-o-Zabar 
Lala Zar  
Zalzala
Daawate Insaf
Anwaar-i-Ahmadi
Dil Ki Muraad
Jalwah-i-Haq
Shari'at
Lisaanul Firdaus
Misbaahul Qur'an (Three Volumes)
Naqsh-i-Khatam (12)
Tafseer-i-Surah-i-Fatiha
Khutbaat-i-Istiqbaaliyah
Tajilliyaat-i-Raza
Da'wat-i-Insaaf
Ta'zeerat-i-Qalam
Aik Walwalah Angez Khitaab
Shakhsiyaat
Hadith, Fiqh Aur Ijtihad ki Shar'ee Haisiyat
Aini Mushadaat
Bazubaan-i-Hikaayat
Izhaar-i-'Aqeedat (a collection of poems)
Afkaar wa Khayaalaat (a collection of articles)
Sadaa-i-Qalam (a collection of letters)
Jama'at-i-Islami

Biography
Zia'ul Mustafa Quadri has written a biography of Arshadul Quadri entitled Hayat-o-Khidmat (Life and Works of Huzoor Sadrush Shariah).
Teacher of Allama Arshadul qadri:
Arshadul Qadri was a student of Huzur Amine Shariat Shah Rafaqat Husain Mehboobe Khuda

Death
He died on the 29 April 2002 and was buried in the at Faizul Uloom Madarsa in Jamshedpur, Jharkhand.

See also
World Islamic Mission
Qamaruzzaman Azmi

References

External links
Arshadul Qadri, a Beacon of Light. milligazette.com
Founder of WIM London

1925 births
2002 deaths
Indian Sufi religious leaders
Indian Sufis
World Islamic Mission
Hanafis
Indian Sunni Muslim scholars of Islam
Barelvis
People from Jamshedpur
Qadiri order